Saved By Fear is the first full-length studio album by Israeli doom/sludge metal trio Dukatalon, released on November 16, 2010, and on iTunes on December 14, 2010. The album was originally released in Israel in a small print in 2009.

The album was recorded by the band as a two-piece, with Zafrir Tzori handling all vocals, guitars and bass duties, and Yariv Shilo on drums and percussion.

Many compared the album's music to that of Eyehategod and Gojira.

Track listing

Personnel
Zafrir Tzori - lead vocals, guitar, bass
Yariv Shilo - drums, percussion

Production
Billy Anderson - audio mixing
Ilan Hilel - engineering

References

2010 albums
Dukatalon albums